Raphael Koczor (born 17 January 1989) is a Polish footballer who plays as a goalkeeper for Rot-Weiss Essen.

Career
Kaczor was born Racibórz and raised in Wetter, Nordrhein-Westfalen. The former striker played in the youth side for TuS Wengern, TuS Esborn, FC Schalke 04 and VfL Bochum. After two years and 50 games for the reserve team of MSV Duisburg signed on 30 May 2010 a contract for Rot Weiss Ahlen. In 2011, Koczor signed for Sportfreunde Siegen.

On 15 June 2019 TSV Steinbach Haiger announced, that they had signed Kaczor on a 2-year contract.

References

External links
 
 

Living people
1989 births
People from Racibórz
German people of Polish descent
Sportspeople from Silesian Voivodeship
Polish footballers
German footballers
Association football goalkeepers
3. Liga players
Regionalliga players
Rot Weiss Ahlen players
Sportfreunde Siegen players
FC Viktoria Köln players
KSV Hessen Kassel players
FC Carl Zeiss Jena players
TSV Steinbach Haiger players
Rot-Weiss Essen players